The 1926 Kent State Silver Foxes football team represented Kent State during the 1926 college football season. In its second season under head coach Merle E. Wagoner, Kent State compiled a 2–6 record and was outscored by a total of 176 to 35.

In the final game of the season, the Silver Foxes gave up two first-quarter touchdowns to Wilmington College. Kent State came back with touchdowns by Searle and Schwartz, but the extra points were missed and the Silver Foxes trailed, 14-12. With one minute remaining in the game, Joe DeLeone drop-kicked the game-winning field goal. Kent State won by a 15-14 score.

Schedule

Roster 
The following 24 players received varsity letters for their participation in the 1926 football team:

 Colville, senior
 Feeley, senior
 Rogers, senior
 Peterka, senior
 Williamson, senior
 Gandee, senior
 Schwartz, senior
 Donald Menough, Ravenna, Ohio, junior, captain
 Burkett, junior
 Levering, junior
 C. Davis, junior
 Chernin, junior
 Thomas, junior
 A. Davis, junior
 Vair, sophomore
 Curtiss, sophomore
 Searl, sophomore
 R. Hall, sophomore
 Spanlger, sophomore
 Graber, sophomore
 McDermott, sophomore
 Dunlavy, sophomore
 Kelso, freshman
 M. McDermott, freshman

References

Kent State
Kent State Golden Flashes football seasons
Kent State Golden Flashes football